Slouch socks (slouchy socks) are a type of sock featuring a heavy non-elastic upper that may be pushed down into heavy folds around the ankles or pulled up to the knee. Slouch socks tend to have a foot that is made of very thin fabric to encourage the layering of the socks. Slouch socks have trended in and out of fashion since the 1980's. They were especially popular in the 80s, from around 1984 and continuing into the 90s.

Description

Slouch socks come in two primary varieties. "Flat-knit" slouch socks have no elastic and have a "two-by-two" knitting pattern. The "flat-knit" term comes from the fact that the ribbing of the socks has a squared-off appearance. "Rib-knit" slouch socks are so-named because of their rounded ribbing.

History

Around 1984 to 1996-97, slouch socks were a popular fashion item across both sexes: kids, youngsters and adults. Many women and girls wore black leggings or lime green, blue, or other colors of leggings with white slouch socks, athletic sneakers and oversized T-shirts or sweatshirts as casual wear or exercise wear. Other colors like pastel yellow, blue or pink and black, red, purple and neon green were also seen. Also, many girls, teens, college girls, and women wore the slouch socks usually over leggings or sometimes sweatpants usually with Keds and oversized tee shirts, sweatshirts and sweaters sometimes with a turtleneck under the sweatshirt (popularly), or sweaters. Or they wore the slouch socks with babydoll or skater dresses or dress shorts with white Wigwam slouch socks worn over black opaque tights with Keds. Also, the socks were worn with jeans or pants rolled or cuffed to show the socks or worn over skinny legged jeans. Boat shoes and cross training sport sneakers were also worn with slouch socks. Many women, college age, teens, and tweens wore slouch socks as part of aerobic exercise wear or over sports leggings in colder weather for running, cross country and other sports. Cheerleaders wore slouch socks along with Keds as part of their uniform from the early to mid 1990s until the late 90's when slouch socks began to be replaced by crew or ankle socks.

Boys, teens, college age and men wore slouch socks with boat shoes, white Sperry canvas sneakers and cross training and other athletic sneakers with jeans or pants rolled or cuffed to show the socks and with casual or dress shorts, sweatpants or over sports leggings in colder weather for running, cross country, and other sports.

References

Socks
1980s fashion